An Ordinary National Certificate (ONC) is a further education qualification in the United Kingdom, awarded by BTEC.  It is at Level 3, equivalent to A Levels.

Educational qualifications in the United Kingdom